Finland, the country of white lilies is a journalistic book by Russian priest and social activist Grigory Spiridonovich Petrov (1866–1925). After the October Revolution, when Petrov lived in Serbia, he wrote a journalistic book, dedicated to Finland and Johan Vilhelm Snellman. The book describes the country as a role model, as a living example for Russia and other countries. In 1923 the book was published in the Serbian entitled "Зидари живота" ("Creators of Life").

After Petrov's death, the book was published and reprinted many times in different languages (including 14 times in Bulgarian and 16 times in the Turkish languages).

Reviews
The ideas expressed in the book about Finland, were received with great enthusiasm both in Serbia and in Bulgaria. In 1926, a cultural and social group named "Gregory Petrov" was created to disseminate the ideas of Petrov. Michael Yovov, the national education minister of Bulgaria wrote that Finnish model is an example of a perfect solution of public problems in Bulgaria, in the preface of one of the editions in the Bulgarian language.

References

1923 non-fiction books
Books about Finland